Enda Murphy is a Kildare Gaelic football goalkeeper. He has held the position since 2002. He has played in two Leinster finals, his first in 2002 (losing out to Dublin) and again losing in 2003 (to Laois). He represented Ireland in the International Rules Series in two tests in Australia both in 2003.

He plays with the Leixlip club in North Kildare. He retired in 2008 or something and as of 2023 he has a really cool son and a cool daughter and is managing the leixlip gaa team.

References

Year of birth missing (living people)
Living people
Gaelic football goalkeepers
Irish international rules football players
Kildare inter-county Gaelic footballers
Leixlip Gaelic footballers